The Malheur River (local pronunciation: "MAL-hyure") is a  tributary of the Snake River in eastern Oregon in the United States. It drains a high desert area, between the Harney Basin and the Blue Mountains and the Snake.

Despite the similarity of name, the river does not flow into nearby Malheur Lake, which is located in the enclosed Harney Basin southwest of the watershed of the river.  When water levels were higher, Malheur Lake would drain into the Malheur River.

Course
The Malheur River rises in the southern Blue Mountains of southern Grant County, south of Strawberry Mountain in the Strawberry Mountain Wilderness. It flows south through Malheur National Forest, then southeast past Drewsey and through Warm Springs Reservoir. At Riverside in western Malheur County it receives the South Fork Malheur River from the south, then turns sharply back northward to Juntura, where it receives the North Fork Malheur River from the north. The mouth of the Malheur River is approximately at Snake river mile (RM) 370 or river kilometer (RK) 600.

History
The name of the river is derived from the French for "misfortune." The name was attached to the river by French Canadian voyageur trappers working for the North West Company on the Snake County Expeditions of Donald Mackenzie as early as 1818 for the unfortunate circumstance that some beaver furs they had cached there were snatched by Indians. The name first appears in the record in 1826 when Peter Skene Ogden, a fur trapper with the Hudson's Bay Company, referred to it as "River au Malheur (from rivière au Malheur, literally: River of the Misfortune)" and thereafter as "Unfortunate River."

The river lived up to its name a second time in 1845, when mountain man Stephen Meek, seeking a faster route along the Oregon Trail, led a migrant party up the river valley into the high desert along a route that has since become known as the Meek Cutoff. After leaving the river valley the party was unable to find a water supply and lost 23 people by the time they reached The Dalles on the Columbia River; gold was found, also see Lost Blue Bucket Mine.

In 1853, 1854 and 1859 the river was used more successfully as the route of the Elliott Cutoff. The emigrants followed the ruts of Stephen Meek until they reached Harney Basin. From here they sought more direct routes to the Deschutes River, where they turned south until reaching the Free Emigrant Road. The road was built over the Cascades through Willamette Pass and brought emigrants into Central Oregon.

River modifications

The lower Malheur River is used for irrigation in the agricultural potato-growing in the Snake River Plain along the Idaho-Oregon border.

The streamflow of the Malheur and its tributaries is heavily influenced by a complex system of irrigation diversions, siphons, and canals, which begin near Malheur river mile 65, near Namorf and Harper, Oregon. This irrigation system extends downstream to the mouth of the Malheur at Ontario, Oregon. Irrigation is used on about  within the Malheur River basin. The irrigation system is part of the Bureau of Reclamation's Vale Project, which includes a number of water impoundments, the largest of which are Warm Springs Reservoir on the mainstem Malheur River, Beulah Reservoir on the North Fork Malheur, Bully Creek Reservoir on Bully Creek, and Malheur Reservoir on Willow Creek. The project is operated and maintained by the Vale-Oregon Irrigation District.

Agricultural runoff has resulted in a phosphorus pollution problem in its lower reaches.

Natural history
The Malheur River watershed was once a major spawning ground for anadromous fish such as salmon. In the early 20th century a number of dams on the Snake River blocked fish migration.

Protected area
A  segment of the Malheur River from Bosenberg Creek to the Malheur National Forest boundary became protected as wild and scenic in 1988 as part of the National Wild and Scenic Rivers System. The protected area includes  of land along the river.

See also
 List of longest streams of Oregon
 List of National Wild and Scenic Rivers
 List of rivers of Oregon

References

External links

 Malheur River
 Malheur Watershed Council

Rivers of Oregon
Wild and Scenic Rivers of the United States
Tributaries of the Snake River
Rivers of Malheur County, Oregon